Hypenomorpha is a genus of moths of the family Erebidae erected by Shigero Sugi in 1977. Both species are known from Japan.

Species
Hypenomorpha calamina (Butler, 1879)
Hypenomorpha falcipennis (Inoue, 1958)

References

Hypeninae